Maneh may refer to:
 Maneh, Iran, a village in North Khorasan Province, Iran
 Maneh District, an administrative subdivision of North Khorasan Province, Iran
 Maneh-ye Pain, a village in Sistan and Baluchestan Province, Iran
 Maneh (given name), an Armenian personal name
 Mordechai Tzvi Maneh (1859–1886), Hebrew poet
 An older spelling for mina (unit), an ancient weight